Pennellia is a genus of flowering plants belonging to the family Brassicaceae.

Its native range is western central and southern central USA (in the states of Arizona, Colorado, New Mexico and Texas) and Mexico, to Central America (in Costa Rica and Guatemala), Bolivia to southern South America (in Argentina and Chile).

The genus name of Pennellia is in honour of Francis W. Pennell (1886–1952), an American botanist best known for his studies of the Scrophulariaceae. It was first described and published in Amer. Midl. Naturalist Vol.5 on page 224 in 1918.

Known species
According to Kew:
Pennellia boliviensis 
Pennellia brachycarpa 
Pennellia lasiocalycina 
Pennellia lechleri 
Pennellia longifolia 
Pennellia micrantha 
Pennellia microsperma 
Pennellia parvifolia 
Pennellia patens 
Pennellia tricornuta 
Pennellia yalaensis

References

Brassicaceae
Brassicaceae genera
Plants described in 1918
Flora of Arizona
Flora of the South-Central United States
Flora of Mexico
Flora of Costa Rica
Flora of Guatemala
Flora of Bolivia
Flora of Argentina
Flora of Chile